Music from the Motion Picture Poetic Justice is the soundtrack to John Singleton's 1993 film Poetic Justice. It was released on June 29, 1993, through Epic Soundtrax, and consisted of a blend of hip hop and R&B music. The album peaked at number 23 on the Billboard 200 chart in the United States and was certified Gold by the Recording Industry Association of America on August 25, 1993.

Three charting singles were released from the album: "Indo Smoke" by Mista Grimm, "Get It Up" by TLC, and "Call Me a Mack" by Usher Raymond, the latter of which was Usher's first official appearance on a song at the age of 14.

The soundtrack also has the Stevie Wonder song "Never Dreamed You'd Leave in Summer", a track that was originally on his 1970 Motown Records album Where I'm Coming From. The song "Definition of a Thug Nigga", recorded by Tupac Shakur for the film, later appeared on his 1997 posthumous album R U Still Down? (Remember Me).

Tupac's "Definition of a Thug Nigga" is an example of braggadocios, violent rap music. The song conflates lyrics of degrading women with aggressive threats and discussions of firearms.

Track listing

Notes
Track 6 contains samples from "Electric Surfboard" performed by Brother Jack McDuff
Track 11 contains samples from "Wind Parade" performed by Donald Byrd

Other songs
There are fourteen songs that appeared in the film but were not released on the soundtrack album:
"Rhapsody in Blue", written by George Gershwin and in the movie Fantasia 2000
"Bonita Applebum (Hootie Mix)", written by Jonathan William Davis, Ali Shaheed Jones-Muhammad, O'Kelly Isley, Ronald Isley, Rudolph Isley, Ernie Isley, Marvin Isley and Chris Jasper, and performed by A Tribe Called Quest
"Between the Sheets", written by O'Kelly Isley, Ronald Isley, Rudolph Isley, Ernie Isley, Marvin Isley and Chris Jasper, and performed by The Isley Brothers
"Smoking Sticks", "Can a Corn" and "Sticky Fingers", written by Artis Ivey Jr. and Bryan "Wino" Dobbs, and performed by Coolio
"Felix the Wonderful Cat", written by Winston Sharples
"Life Betta", written by Sean Reveron, Julian Harker and Osagyefu Kennedy, and performed by Ruffneck
"Gangsta Bitch", written by Anthony Peaks and Jonathan William Davis
"Stand by Your Man", written by Billy Sherrill and Tammy Wynette, and performed by Tammy Wynette
"Family Reunion", written by Kenneth Gamble and Leon Huff, and performed by The O'Jays
"Niggers Are Scared of Revolution", written by Omar Ben Hassan, and performed by The Last Poets
"Back Stabbers", written by Leon Huff, Gene McFadden and John Whitehead, and performed by The O'Jays
"Again", written by Janet Jackson, James Harris III and Terry Lewis, and performed by Janet Jackson

Personnel
Carlton Batts – mastering
Paris Davis – associate producer
Vivian Scott – associate producer
John Singleton – executive producer, liner notes
Glen Brunman – executive producer
Paul Stewart – music supervisor
David Coleman – art direction
Eli Reed – photography

Charts

Certifications

References

External links

1993 soundtrack albums
Drama film soundtracks
Hip hop soundtracks
Epic Records soundtracks
Albums produced by Dr. Dre
Albums produced by Warren G
Albums produced by L.A. Reid
Albums produced by Pete Rock
Albums produced by Tim & Bob
Contemporary R&B soundtracks
Albums produced by Henry Cosby
Albums produced by Dallas Austin
Albums produced by Raphael Saadiq
Albums produced by Stanley Clarke
Albums produced by Sly and Robbie
Albums produced by Babyface (musician)